The National Temperance Society and Publishing House was a publishing house which advocated personal alcohol temperance and a governmental ban on the personal consumption of alcohol. It was based in New York City.

Foundation
It was founded in 1865 following a two-day, non-denominational conference of temperance advocates Saratoga Springs, New York. Among its founders were William E. Dodge, Neal Dow and James Black. Dodge was elected president and held the position until his death in 1883.

Publications
During its first 60 years, it published over a billion pages of literature in support of the temperance movement. Its three monthly magazines had a combined circulation of about 600,000. They were The National Temperance Advocate for adults, The Youth's Temperance Banner for adolescents, and The Water Lily for children.  The Society also published over 2,000 books and pamphlets in addition to textbooks, posters and flyers.

The group's archive is held by the Presbyterian Historical Society in Philadelphia.

Notable people
 James Black (prohibitionist) (1823-1893), American temperance movement activist and a founder of the Prohibition Party. 
 Julia Colman (1828–1909), American temperance educator, activist, editor, writer
 Sara Jane Crafts (1845–1930), educator, author, social reformer
 George Cruikshank (1792-1878), British caricaturist and book illustrator
 William E. Dodge (1805-1883), American businessman, politician and activist who served as the organization's founding president (1865-1883)
 William E. Dodge Jr. (1832-1903), American copper magnate, activist, and philanthropist. He was the son of William E. Dodge
 Neal Dow, (1804-1897), American temperance advocate and politician
 James J. Spelman (1841-1894), American was a journalist and politician in New York and Mississippi

References

External links
Cheers! Temperance society urges sobriety in bootleg era at Vigo County Historical Society
 

1865 establishments in New York (state)
Neal Dow
Publishing companies based in New York City
Publishing companies established in 1865
Saratoga Springs, New York
Temperance organizations in the United States